The Hong Kong Housing Authority Exhibition Centre is managed by Hong Kong Housing Authority. It is located on the 4/F of Block 3, Hong Kong Housing Authority Headquarters, Ho Man Tin. Permanently closed in March, 2022.

Exhibition
The Opening Ceremony of the Centre was held in July, 2002. The history of public housing estates is displayed in a multi-layer display. The first layer displays the role of the Housing Authority in Hong Kong History throughout the decades, in form of photos, scripts and videos. With models, mock-up flats and other exhibits, the second layer displays the physical forms of  public housing development. The third layer shows the development of public housing, with side by side the change of the economic and society of Hong Kong in the 50 years.

The highlight of the Centre is the diorama showing where all the public housing estates in Hong Kong are located.

External links

Official website

Museums in Hong Kong
Public housing in Hong Kong
Ho Man Tin
Urban planning museums